Ciudad Piar is a town in the state of Bolívar, Venezuela, about  south of Ciudad Bolívar, but a longer  by road. The town is in the eastern foothills of Cerro Bolivar, a mountain that is being mined for iron ore, and just inland from the huge Embalse de Guri reservoir. It is the administrative seat for Angostura Municipality. It is primarily a mining town.

In 2010 the Jesús Rivero Workers' Bolivarian University opened in Ciudad Piar.

Notes and references

Populated places in Bolívar (state)